The 1886 Dutch Reformed Church split, also known as Doleantie (from Latin dolere, 'to feel sorrow') was the name of a prominent schism in the Dutch Reformed Church (Nederlands Hervormde Kerk) which took place in 1886 and was led by the renowned minister Abraham Kuyper. The Doleantie was not the first schism in the Dutch Reformed Church. In 1834 another schism, the Secession of 1834 (Afscheiding van 1834), had led to the formation of the Christian Reformed Church in the Netherlands (Christelijke Gereformeerde Kerk in Nederland).

In 1885 the first moves towards schism were made when Kuyper and his supporters issued a formal complaint about liberalizing practices in the Dutch Reformed Church. Their complaint never won broad support within the church, and in the winter of 1885-1886 the call for schism grew stronger amongst a large number of conservative congregations, most of which were located in the Veluwe area and elsewhere in what is today the Dutch Bible Belt.

The first congregation to secede was Kootwijk, on 7 February 1886 appointed a minister trained at the Free University of Amsterdam without waiting for permission of its classis. The following day the congregation in Voorthuizen followed suit.

The seceded congregations united in the Low German Reformed Church (Dolerende) (Nederduits Gereformeerde Kerk (Dolerende)). Nederduits Gereformeerde Kerk had been the official name of the Dutch Reformed Church until 1816 and with this name the seceded churches wanted to show that they thought of themselves as the legitimate continuation of this church, which was highly prominent in the Dutch Republic. The suffix (Dolerende), meaning 'those who feel sorrow', was added to show their disapproval with the Dutch Reformed Church.

Later in 1886 Kuyper and his supporters occupied the New Church in Amsterdam, the seat of the governing body of the Reformed Church, to force a settlement in the conflict over church property that had followed the Doleantie. In July 1886 the dolerenden had to accept a verdict against them.

In 1892 the Nederduits Gereformeerde Kerken (Dolerende) merged with the Christian Reformed Church in the Netherlands to form the Reformed Churches in the Netherlands.

See also

1834 Dutch Reformed Church split
1857 Dutch Reformed Church split

External links
Description of the history of the Protestant Church in the Netherlands (PKN)
Information about the Dutch Reformed Church (Nederlands Hervormde Kerk) in the Protestant Church in the Netherlands (PKN) 
Information about the Reformed Churches in the Netherlands (Gereformeerde Kerken in Nederland) in the Protestant Church in the Netherlands (PKN) 

History of Calvinism in the Netherlands
Dutch Reformed Church
19th-century Calvinism
1886 in Christianity